Sir Josiah Rees (1821–1899) was the Chief Justice of Bermuda. He was knighted by letters patent in 1891.

References 

Knights Bachelor
British barristers
1821 births
1899 deaths